Interstate 95 (I-95) is a part of the Interstate Highway System that runs north–south from Miami, Florida to Houlton, Maine. It is the only primary Interstate Highway in Maine. In 2004, the highway's route between Portland and Gardiner was changed so that it encompasses the entire Maine Turnpike (including the former I-495 between Falmouth and Gardiner), a toll road running from Kittery to Augusta.

Route description

I-95 enters Maine as a six-lane highway from New Hampshire on the Piscataqua River Bridge, which connects Portsmouth, New Hampshire, with Kittery. At mile 0.38, the highway becomes the Maine Turnpike. The highway runs in a general northeasterly direction, parallel with US Route 1 (US 1), at this point. I-95 bypasses the Biddeford/Saco area, with a spur route, I-195, connecting to Old Orchard Beach.

At Scarborough, I-95 meets the southern terminus of I-295 and narrows to four lanes. The highway turns north, serving Portland International Jetport and bypassing Portland to the west. At Falmouth, the highway meets unsigned I-495, also called the Falmouth Spur. Until January 2004, I-95 followed the Falmouth Spur and I-295 between Falmouth and Gardiner.

The highway continues north along the Maine Turnpike (which was I-495 prior to 2004) through Gray to Auburn and Lewiston, which the turnpike bypasses to the south. The highway then runs in an easterly direction to meet the northern terminus of I-295 at Gardiner. From there, I-95 parallels the Kennebec River past Augusta and Waterville. The highway then crosses the river at Fairfield and then turns northeast along the Sebasticook River past Pittsfield to Newport.

I-95 then continues east alongside US 2 from Newport to Bangor, where I-395 connects to the city of Brewer. The highway runs along the northern edge of Bangor's center, then turns northeast, following the Penobscot River past Orono and Old Town. (Prior to the early 1980s, I-95 was a super two highway north of Old Town).

The highway continues north, still running near the river, toward Howland. Near Lincoln, I-95 runs north through uninhabited forest land, crossing the Penobscot River at Medway. The highway goes northeast and east, passing a series of small Aroostook County farming towns before reaching Houlton, where it connects to US 2 and New Brunswick Route 95 at the international border.  North of Bangor, traffic levels drop noticeably, with an annual average daily traffic of only about 5,000 in northern Penobscot County and going down to as low as 2,000 to 4,000 in Houlton. As an Interstate Highway, all of I-95 in Maine is included in the National Highway System, a network of roads important to the country's economy, defense, and mobility.

History

The Maine Turnpike Authority (MTA) was created by the Maine Legislature in 1941 to build and operate a toll highway connecting Kittery and Fort Kent. In 1947, the first section of highway, designated the Maine Turnpike, opened between Kittery and Portland. In 1953, the MTA began construction on an extension to the state capital at Augusta using the former right-of-way of the Portland–Lewiston Interurban railway from Portland through West Falmouth. The original turnpike was the largest construction project in the state's history until the construction of the extension, which opened to the public on December 13, 1955.

The Maine Turnpike was the first highway in the nation that was funded using revenue bonds. It remains self-financed and does not receive funding from the state or federal government. When the first section opened in 1947, it was only the second long-distance superhighway in the US following the October 1940 opening of the Pennsylvania Turnpike. For these reasons, the Maine Turnpike was named a National Historic Civil Engineering Landmark by the American Society of Civil Engineers in 1999.

In 1956, one year after the Portland–Augusta extension opened, Congress created the Interstate Highway System. The remaining sections to be built—from Augusta to Fort Kent—would be publicly funded freeways instead of toll roads under the MTA. Today, this highway, which ends at Houlton instead of Fort Kent, is signed as I-95 throughout and the Maine Turnpike between the New Hampshire line at Kittery and the junction with US 202 near Augusta.

In 2015, the MTA purchased the segment from the Piscataqua River Bridge to milemarker 2.2 of I-95 from the Maine Department of Transportation (MaineDOT).

Speed limits
In 1987, Congress allowed states to post  on rural Interstate Highways. Following the relaxation, Maine increased its speed limit. It passed, with Maine the first state east of the Mississippi River since the 1970s to establish a  speed limit.

A further law passed in 2013 by the Maine Legislature allowed MaineDOT and the MTA to change speed limits with the approval of the Maine State Police. These areas included the section from milemarker 114 just outside Augusta to mile 126 just before Waterville. Speed limits on sections controlled by the MTA increased on August 11, 2014.

Tolls

The Maine Turnpike is a toll road for all of its length except south of York and between Auburn and Sabattus. Flat-fee tolls are paid upon entering the turnpike and at toll barriers in York, New Gloucester, and West Gardiner. , it costs passenger vehicles $8.00 with cash and out-of-state E-ZPasses and $6.70 with a Maine issued E-ZPass to travel the entire length of the turnpike. The turnpike joined the E-ZPass electronic toll collection network in 2005, replacing the former Maine-only system designated Transpass that was implemented in 1997.

The tolls on the Maine Turnpike were not supposed to be permanent. Toll collections were to stop once the MTA paid off the debt from the road's construction. In the 1980s, the bonds were going to be paid off but the Maine Legislature authorized the MTA in 1982 to continue as a quasigovernmental agency and to continue to collect tolls in order to fund the maintenance of the section of highway controlled by the MTA.

Service plazas and rest areas
There are eleven total rest areas on I-95 in Maine, five of which are full service plazas operated by the MTA. Five of the rest areas are accessible from northbound only, four are accessible from southbound only, and two are accessible from both directions. The rest stops are open 24 hours and all provide restrooms and visitor information. Food and fuel services as well as ATMs are available only at the five major plazas. The plazas are at the following locations:

 Kennebunk: A separate plaza is located on each direction of the turnpike at milepost 25. These plazas are the largest and most profitable in the state, and they have near-identical layouts and each includes Burger King, Starbucks, Hershey's Ice Cream, Citgo gas stations, and Z-Market giftshops among the offerings. The original plazas opened in 1947 and incorporated a pedestrian tunnel under the highway to connect the two. These original plazas were replaced in 1972, and the tunnel was sealed. The 1972 plazas were then replaced during 2006–2007, reopening in 2007.
 Gray (northbound) and Cumberland (southbound): A separate plaza is located on each direction of the turnpike on either side of the Gray–Cumberland town line at milepost 59. Each includes Burger King (both sit-down and drive-thru) and a Citgo gas station. Both plazas were rebuilt in 2007 and are currently the only two plazas to feature a drive-thru food option.
 West Gardiner: Accessible from both directions of both the turnpike (I-95) and I-295, which converge just north of the plaza. The plaza itself is located just off the highways, along State Route 9 (SR 9) and SR 126. Similar in layout to the Kennebunk plazas, Burger King, Starbucks, and Citgo gas are among the offerings. This plaza also includes the Center for Maine Craft, a giftshop featuring locally made products and visitor information. The West Gardiner plaza was built and opened for business in 2008. The plaza replaced two smaller rest areas that were located in Lewiston (southbound at milepost 83) and Litchfield (northbound at milepost 98), both of which were closed and demolished.

There is a rest area and tourist welcome center located on the turnpike northbound at milepost 3 in Kittery. There are weigh stations located on the turnpike northbound and southbound in York at milepost 4 (southbound) and milepost 6 (northbound). There are ramps to and from the northbound turnpike to the Saco Ramada Hotel and Conference Center in Saco at milepost 35. The ramps are from the original exit 5 which was replaced when I-195 was opened just to the north. The hotel was built on the site of the old toll plaza. Ramps connecting the hotel to and from the southbound turnpike were removed as part of the widening project in the early 2000s when hotel ownership opted not to pay nearly $1 million (equivalent to $ in ) to build a new bridge. The MTA is planning to reestablish the exit at this location by 2022 in order to relieve traffic congestion at the intersection of I-195 and Industrial Park Road, which can often back up to I-95.

North of Augusta, there are two additional pairs of rest areas before I-95's northern terminus in Houlton. Separate facilities are located on each direction of I-95 in Hampden, just south of Bangor; and in Medway, about halfway between Bangor and Houlton. There are 24-hour restrooms at all four locations, while the Hampden facilities each feature a state-operated Maine information center available during daytime hours. A final rest area, which also contained a state-operated Maine information center, was located in Houlton, and was accessible from both directions of I-95 by taking exit 302. The rest area has since been decommissioned and demolished as of mid-2022.

Emergency routes

In 2019, MaineDOT began signing emergency routes along roads near I-95. The routes generally lead from one exit to the next exit and are meant to be used when sections of the highway must be closed due to an accident or other disruption. In such an event, electronic signs will be activated and flaggers deployed to direct drivers to use the appropriate emergency route to lead them around the closure and maintain traffic flow. Northbound routes are designated with a single letter, while southbound routes are designated with double letters. This system was first used when a section of highway was closed due to the death of a Maine State Trooper in an accident.

Exit list

Auxiliary routes
Interstate 195, a spur in Saco
Interstate 295, runs from I-95 near downtown Portland to I-95 in West Gardiner
Interstate 395, a spur east of Bangor
Interstate 495, unsigned designation for the Falmouth Spur

References

External links

 Maine Turnpike Official Site
 Steve Anderson's BostonRoads.com: Maine Turnpike (I-95)

95
 Maine
Toll roads in Maine
Tolled sections of Interstate Highways
Transportation in York County, Maine
Transportation in Cumberland County, Maine
Transportation in Androscoggin County, Maine
Transportation in Kennebec County, Maine
Transportation in Somerset County, Maine
Transportation in Waldo County, Maine
Transportation in Penobscot County, Maine
Transportation in Aroostook County, Maine
Historic Civil Engineering Landmarks